San Simeone Profeta, also known as San Simeone Grande is a church in the sestiere of Santa Croce in Venice, Italy. The adjective Grande distinguishes this church from the San Simeone Piccolo, which was smaller in size until its 18th-century reconstruction. The near palaces are Palazzo Gradenigo and Palazzo Soranzo Cappello.

History 

This church was founded by 967 by the patrician families of Ghisi, Adoldi and Briosi. Originally a modest building of wood, after a fire in 1150, it was rebuilt in stone and made parish church. The Napoleonic government joined the parish to that of San Simeone Piccolo

Description 
The interior floor appears to have been raised after burials were pursued here during the plague of 1630. The current church has a plain neoclassical façade. The interior was rebuilt in the early eighteenth century by Domenico Margutti. Inside, to the right of the entrance, is  a Presentation at the Temple with portraits of donors by Jacopo Palma the Younger. In the second altar of the left nave is a Last Supper by Tintoretto. The Annunciation, previously attributed to Palma the Younger is today recognized as a work of the painter Blanc.

References
Church and Parish of San Simeon Profeta

Simeone Profeta
Neoclassical architecture in Venice
Neoclassical church buildings in Italy